Guhaksan is a mountain on the boundary between the provinces of Gangwon-do and Chungcheongbuk-do, in South Korea. Its area extends across the cities of Wonju and Jecheon.

See also
 List of mountains in Korea

Notes

References
 

Mountains of South Korea
Wonju
Jecheon
Mountains of North Chungcheong Province
Mountains of Gangwon Province, South Korea